Moment in Peking is a 2005 Chinese television series produced by CCTV. It is adapted from the novel Moment in Peking by Lin Yutang, who was nominated for a Nobel Prize in 1940 and 1950.

Cast
 Yao Mulan, played by Zhao Wei
 Zeng Sunya, played by Pan Yueming
 Yao Sian, played by Chen Baoguo
 Mrs. Yao, played by Pan Hong
 Kong Lifu, played by Victor Huang
 Yao Mochou, played by Qiu Qiwen
 Niu Sidao, played by Wang Gang
 Niu Suyun, played by Hu Ke

Reception
National rating champion of the year 2005 in China, 8.782%.(Source:AGB Nielsen)
"Zhao Wei is grace and elegence,who controlled each sense."----Asia Times

Accolades

Influence
After airing on Taiwan and mainland China, for the series is very popular, there were a large stream to Lin Yutang's former residence. Audience started to focus on the classic novel again.

In an episode of Taiwan long-term series Unforgettable Memories, the major role is watching the sense of Zhao Wei and Huang Weide break up in Moment in Peking.

External links

Sina.com-Moment in Peking Official Page
Xinhuanet.com

References

2005 Chinese television series debuts
2005 Chinese television series endings
Chinese period television series
Mandarin-language television shows
Television shows based on Chinese novels
China Central Television original programming
Television shows written by Zou Jingzhi